Jérôme Guihoata (born 7 October 1994) is a Cameroonian professional footballer who plays as a centre back for Cypriot club Omonia Aradippou.

Club career

Panionios
In the summer of 2016, the Cameroonian central defender Jérôme Guihoata, who was recently released from US Créteil-Lusitanos, was on trial with the Greek Super League club Panionios, managed to impress club's manager Marinos Ouzounidis in training and he is expected to sign a two-season contract.
On 9 December 2017, on the 82nd minute Guihoata scored his first goal with the club due to a mistake from Platanias goalie Antonis Kokkalas. The Greek goalie made a bad calculation in a foul run by Samed Yeşil, with Gioatta benefiting and scoring the second goal sealing a vital victory for the club.

International career
Guihoata played his first international game with the senior national team on 10 August 2013 in and against Gabon (1–0), after he came on as a substitute for Julien Ebah in the 68th minute of that game. On 29 May 2017, Jérôme Guihoata was included for the first time in Cameroon's squad for Morocco on June 10 for the 2019 Africa Cup of Nations qualifiers and the Confederations Cup to be held from June 17 to July 2 in Russia. Cameroon will participate in the second group with Chile, Australia and Germany, representing Africa.

References

External links
 

1994 births
Living people
Cameroonian footballers
Cameroonian expatriate footballers
Cameroon international footballers
Association football defenders
2015 Africa Cup of Nations players
2017 FIFA Confederations Cup players
Expatriate footballers in France
Tours FC players
Valenciennes FC players
Footballers from Yaoundé